The 1960 Miami Hurricanes football team represented the University of Miami as an independent during the 1960 NCAA University Division football season. Led by 13th-year head coach Andy Gustafson, the Hurricanes played their home games at the Miami Orange Bowl in Miami, Florida. Miami finished the season 6–4.

Schedule

References

Miami
Miami Hurricanes football seasons
Miami Hurricanes football